Dolichyl-P-Glc:Glc1Man9GlcNAc2-PP-dolichol alpha-1,3-glucosyltransferase (ALG8, Dol-P-Glc:Glc1Man9GlcNAc2-PP-Dol alpha-1,3-glucosyltransferase) is an enzyme with systematic name dolichyl beta-D-glucosyl phosphate:D-Glc-alpha-(1->3)-D-Man-alpha-(1->2)-D-Man-alpha-(1->2)-D-Man-alpha-(1->3)-(D-Man-alpha-(1->2)-D-Man-alpha-(1->3)-(D-Man-alpha-(1->2)-D-Man-alpha-(1->6))-D-Man-alpha-(1->6))-D-Man-beta-(1->4)-D-GlcNAc-beta-(1->4)-D-GlcNAc-diphosphodolichol alpha-1,3-glucosyltransferase.

This enzyme catalyses the following chemical reaction

which is in words:
 dolichyl beta-D-glucosyl phosphate + D-Glc-alpha-(1->3)-D-Man-alpha-(1->2)-D-Man-alpha-(1->2)-D-Man-alpha-(1->3)-[D-Man-alpha-(1->2)-D-Man-alpha-(1->3)-[D-Man-alpha-(1->2)-D-Man-alpha-(1->6)]-D-Man-alpha-(1->6)]-D-Man-beta-(1->4)-D-GlcNAc-beta-(1->4)-D-GlcNAc-diphosphodolichol  D-Glc-alpha-(1->3)-D-Glc-alpha-(1->3)-D-Man-alpha-(1->2)-D-Man-alpha-(1->2)-D-Man-alpha-(1->3)-[D-Man-alpha-(1->2)-D-Man-alpha-(1->3)-[D-Man-alpha-(1->2)-D-Man-alpha-(1->6)]-D-Man-alpha-(1->6)]-D-Man-beta-(1->4)-D-GlcNAc-beta-(1->4)-D-GlcNAc-diphosphodolichol + dolichyl phosphate

See also 
 EC 2.4.1.267 (dolichyl-P-Glc:Man9GlcNAc2-PP-dolichol alpha-1,3-glucosyltransferase)
 EC 2.4.1.256 (dolichyl-P-Glc:Glc2Man9GlcNAc2-PP-dolichol alpha-1,2-glucosyltransferase)

References

External links 
 

EC 2.4.1